Pushpa Kamal Dahal (commonly known as Prachanda; born 1954) is a Nepalese politician and former Prime Minister of Nepal.

Prachanda may also refer to:
 Prachanda Kulla, a 1984 Indian Kannada film
 Prachanda Putanigalu, a 1981 Indian Kannada film
 Marxism–Leninism–Maoism–Prachanda Path, ideological line of the Communist Party of Nepal (Maoist Centre)
 Bagh Prachanda Khan, a village in Beanibazar, Sylhet district, Bangladesh named after Prachanda Khan

See also 
 Parachanda